KR is the ISO 3166-1 alpha-2 and WMO country code for South Korea.

KR or Kr may also refer to:

Sports
 KR (basketball club), associated with Knattspyrnufélag Reykjavíkur
 Knattspyrnufélag Reykjavíkur, an Icelandic football club
 Kickoff returner, in American and Canadian football

Transportation
 Comores Aviation International (IATA airline designator KR)
 Kenya Railways
 Konkan Railway, India
 Korea National Railway, formerly Korea Rail Network Authority
 Krasnodar International Airport (IATA airport code KR), serving the southern Russian city of Krasnodar
 Province of Crotone, Italy, vehicle registration

Other
  Kr., German for kreis, a district akin to County
 .kr, country code top-level domain (ccTLD) of South Korea
 KR (ANSI), an ANSI X3.64 escape sequence
 K. R. Market, Bangalore, India
 Kamen Rider, a tokusatsu multimedia franchise created by Shotaro Ishinomori.
 Kanuri language (ISO 639 alpha-2)
 Kayser-Roth, clothing manufacturer in North Carolina
 Kedaulatan Rakyat, a newspaper in Yogyakarta, Indonesia
 Kiribati (FIPS 10-4 country code), a sovereign state in Micronesia
 Knowledge representation and reasoning, in artificial intelligence
 Kola Real, a Peruvian brand of soft drinks
 Kroger, an American grocery chain, NYSE symbol
 Krone, or Krona, several currencies
 Krypton, symbol Kr, a chemical element
 Grand Duke Konstantin Konstantinovich of Russia (1858–1915), poet known by his pen name "KR"
 Order of the Knights of Rizal, the sole order of knighthood in the Philippines